Stuart Chalmers (born 18 November 1982) is a Scottish cricketer. He made his One Day International debut against Canada in 2009.

References

1982 births
Living people
Scottish cricketers
Scotland One Day International cricketers
Cricketers from Edinburgh